The 2022 Open International de Tennis de Roanne was a professional tennis tournament played on indoor hard courts. It was the second edition of the tournament which was part of the 2022 ATP Challenger Tour. It took place in Roanne, France between 7 and 13 November 2022.

Singles main-draw entrants

Seeds

 1 Rankings are as of 31 October 2022.

Other entrants
The following players received wildcards into the singles main draw:
  Ugo Blanchet
  Arthur Fils
  Giovanni Mpetshi Perricard

The following players received entry from the qualifying draw:
  Mathias Bourgue
  Antoine Hoang
  Maxime Janvier
  Alibek Kachmazov
  Alexandar Lazarov
  Valentin Royer

The following player received entry as a lucky loser:
  Denis Yevseyev

Champions

Singles

  Hugo Gaston def.  Henri Laaksonen 6–7(6–8), 7–5, 6–1.

Doubles

  Sadio Doumbia /  Fabien Reboul def.  Dustin Brown /  Szymon Walków 7–6(7–5), 6–4.

References

2022 ATP Challenger Tour
2022 in French tennis
November 2022 sports events in France